Fruticicola fruticum is a species of medium-sized, air-breathing land snail, a terrestrial pulmonate gastropod mollusc in the family Camaenidae.

Shell description
The shell of this species is globular with a deep umbilicus. The shell color is whitish or brownish.

Distribution
Europe (until recently including the southeastern part of British Isles, where it was probably introduced.)
Austria
Bulgaria
Czech Republic - least concern (LC)
Germany
Great Britain - extinct
Netherlands
Poland
Serbia
Finland
Slovakia
Ukraine

Life cycle

This species of snail makes and uses love darts during mating.

References

Camaenidae
Molluscs of Europe
Gastropods described in 1774
Taxa named by Otto Friedrich Müller